Riga International Airport is the international airport of Riga, the capital of Latvia, and the largest airport in the Baltic states with direct flights to 76 destinations as of November 2019. It serves as a hub for airBaltic, SmartLynx Airlines and RAF-Avia, and as one of the base airports for Ryanair. The Latvian national carrier airBaltic is the largest carrier that serves the airport, followed by Ryanair. The airport is located in the Mārupe Municipality west of Riga, approximately 10 km from its city centre.

History
The airport was built in 1973 as an alternative to Spilve Airport, which had become outdated. It is a state-owned joint-stock company, with the owner of all shares being the government of Latvia. The holder of the state capital share is Latvia's Ministry of Transport.

Renovation and modernization of the airport was completed in 2001, coinciding with the 800th anniversary of the founding of the city. In 2006 and 2016, the new north terminal extensions were opened. A maintenance, repair and overhaul facility was opened in the autumn of 2006, to be run as a joint venture between two local companies: Concors and SR-Technik. In 2010, the first dedicated business aviation terminal of the Baltics opened at the airport.

Riga had nonstop flights to the United States between 2005 and 2017. Uzbekistan Airways employed Boeing 767s on a Tashkent-New York City service via the Latvian capital. However, once the carrier acquired Boeing 787s and began to fly directly from Uzbekistan to America, it decided to eliminate the Riga-New York City sector.

Facilities

Terminal
The airport features a single, two-storey passenger terminal building which has been expanded and upgraded to modern standards several times in recent years. The landside consists of a main hall containing a single row of 36 check-in counters as well as some shops and the security area on the upper floor while the arrivals area, baggage reclaim and some service counters are located on the ground floor below. The airside features departure areas B and C split up into two piers with the former original, smaller boarding area A now only used for some arrivals. Both piers feature overall eight stands with jetbridges plus four walk-boarding stands from the upper level as well as several more gates for bus boarding on their ground levels. The B pier is used for Schengen Area departures and arrivals, while the C pier is for non-Schengen Area departures and arrivals. The terminal features outlets by Narvesen, Costa Coffee, and TGI Fridays amongst others, as well as a single airport lounge.

Runway
The airport has a single runway in directions 18/36, which is 3,200 m in length and equipped with ILS CAT II.

Other facilities
Both airBaltic and the Latvian Civil Aviation Agency maintain their head offices at Riga International Airport.

Airlines and destinations

Passenger

The following airlines operate regular scheduled and charter flights to and from Riga:

Cargo

Statistics

Route statistics

Largest airlines

Annual passenger numbers

Ground transportation

Bus
Riga Airport is accessible by bus line 22, operated by Rīgas Satiksme, which runs between Riga city centre and the airport. Moreover, there are international bus connections from the airport to cities in Estonia, Lithuania, Poland and Germany.

Car
Riga Airport can be reached by car via the highway P133 which connects the airport with European route E22. The airport has 3 car parking areas, with ~1500 parking spaces, offering both short- and long-term parking.

Rail
An airport train station is included as part of the Rail Baltica project. A contract for construction design was signed on 20 March 2018.

Incidents and accidents
 On 17 September 2016, an airBaltic Bombardier Dash 8 Q400 NextGen aircraft made an emergency landing on the runway of Riga International Airport without its nose landing gear deployed. The plane was carrying 63 passengers and 4 crew members and was forced to return to Riga International Airport following issues with its front chassis. The runway was closed between 10:26 and 15:55 as a safety precaution following an emergency landing. Seven inbound flights and four outbound flights were cancelled, 17 flights were diverted to Tallinn Airport and Kaunas Airport and others were delayed. The aircraft involved was YL-BAI and the flight BT 641 was scheduled to fly from Riga to Zürich Airport. No injuries were reported.
 On 17 February 2017, a VIM Airlines charter flight to Ufa, Russia slid off the runway during take-off. The aircraft was carrying the Togliatti Lada ice hockey club team, including 40 passengers and 7 crew members.  No injuries were reported. The aircraft's engine was damaged as it hit airport equipment. The runway was inspected and closed for three hours after the incident. Flights were diverted to Tallinn Airport and Kaunas Airport and others were delayed.
 On 3 December 2021, due to heavy snowfall, an airBaltic Airbus A220-300 (YL-CSE) slid off the runway after the landing at Riga Airport from Stockholm (flight BT102).
 On 8 March 2023, an airBaltic flight from Paris slid off the runway while landing. None of the 89 passengers or 7 crew members were injured.

See also

 List of the busiest airports in Europe
 List of largest airports in the Baltic states
 List of the busiest airports in the former USSR
 List of airports in Latvia
 Transportation in Latvia
 Rīgas Satiksme (Riga Public Transport)

References

External links

RIX Marks the Spot for Expansion

Airports built in the Soviet Union
Airports in Latvia
Airports established in 1973
1973 establishments in the Soviet Union
1973 establishments in Latvia
Mārupe Municipality